High Point Estates is an unincorporated community in Alberta, Canada within Rocky View County that is recognized as a designated place by Statistics Canada. It is adjacent to the Town of Chestermere to the west.

Demographics 

See also 
List of communities in Alberta
List of designated places in Alberta

References 

Designated places in Alberta
Localities in Rocky View County